The 32nd Filipino Academy of Movie Arts and Sciences Awards Night was held in 1984 in the Philippines. This is for the Outstanding Achievements of the different  films for the year 1983.

Karnal won the most awards including the FAMAS Award for Best Picture and best director for Marilou Diaz-Abaya who became the second woman director to win the award. The best actor award was also give to two great actors; Eddie Garcia and Fernando Poe Jr. for the first time in FAMAS History. On the other hand, veteran actress, Charito Solis won her fifth Best Actress trophy, elevating her to Hall of Fame Status

Awards

Major Awards
Winners are listed first and highlighted with boldface.

Special Awardee

Lifetime Achievement Award
Ben Perez

References

External links
FAMAS Awards 

FAMAS Award
FAMAS
FAMAS